The 1950 Albi Grand Prix was a non-championship Formula One race held on 16 July 1950.

The race was contested over two heats of 17 laps with the result decided by aggregate. The winner was Louis Rosier in a Talbot-Lago after finishing third and second in respectively Heat 1 and Heat 2. José Froilán González finished second in a Maserati and Maurice Trintignant came in third in a Simca-Gordini. Juan Manuel Fangio in a Maserati set fastest lap.

Qualifying

Results

Heats

Aggregate

References
oldracingcars.com – Grand Prix d'Albi, 16 Jul 1950
1950 Non-World Championship Grands Prix – XII Circuit de l'Albigeois

Albi Grand Prix
1950 in French motorsport
Motorsport in France